Yuliya Nikolayevna Kachalova (born December 13, 1989 in Moscow) is a Russian sprint canoeist. Kachalova represented Russia at the 2012 Summer Olympics in London, where she competed in the women's K-4 500 metres, along her teammates Yuliana Salakhova, Vera Sobetova, and Natalia Podolskaya. Kachalova and her team finished seventh in the final by six thousandths of a second (0.006) behind the Portuguese team (led by Teresa Portela), with a time of 1:33.459.

References

External links
NBC Olympics Profile

1989 births
Russian female canoeists
Living people
Olympic canoeists of Russia
Canoeists at the 2012 Summer Olympics
Sportspeople from Moscow